Olcott Park is a city park in Virginia, Minnesota, United States.

History
Olcott Park was named  after William J. Olcott, an officer of the Oliver Iron Mining Company.  In 1905 the company first leased the land to the city for $1 a year if the city would pay taxes on it. The city purchased the land in 1939 for $9,015.

Description
The Olcott Park in Virginia, Minnesota is a  amount of land on the north side of town.  It is bordered by 9th St. N and Essentia Health/Virginia Regional Medical Center on the north and the Calvary Cemetery on the west.  On the east it is bordered by N 9th Ave W, and a city museum (Heritage Museum).  On the south, the park is bordered by Parkview Learning Center and some little-league baseball fields.

Along with a large playground area, the park also boasts a bandstand in its center where Virginia City Band performances take place in the summer. In the northern region of the park, a fountain still stands today that was built during the Great Depression and renovated in 2019.  Also, a structure in the southern edge of the park still stands that held monkeys and bear cubs prior to World War II.

Olcott Park Greenhouse

It is open to the public year-round without charge.

This three-room greenhouse dates from the 1930s. Its central room contains a good collection of exotic plants, ranging in size from small specimens to mature Ponderosa lemon trees bearing fruit, with cacti and succulents, large agave, palm, and ficus specimens. Historically it was the site for huge begonia shows which attracted thousands of visitors. The north and south greenhouses were used to raise bedding plants for flower beds throughout the city.

See also 
 List of botanical gardens in the United States

References

External links
 Olcott Park–Iron Range Tourism Bureau
 More Information

Protected areas of St. Louis County, Minnesota
Regional parks in Minnesota
Virginia, Minnesota